Tsai Mi-ching is a Taiwanese politician. He is currently the Deputy Minister of Science and Technology since 20 May 2016.

Early life
Tsai obtained his bachelor's and master's degree in electrical engineering from National Taiwan University of Science and Technology in June 1981 and June 1983 respectively and doctoral degree in engineering science from University of Oxford in the United Kingdom in August 1989.

See also
 Ministry of Science and Technology (Taiwan)

References

Living people
Government ministers of Taiwan
National Taiwan University of Science and Technology alumni
Alumni of the University of Oxford
Year of birth missing (living people)